The 99th Indiana Volunteer Infantry Regiment was an infantry regiment that served in the Union Army during the American Civil War.

Service
The 99th Indiana was mustered into Federal service at South Bend, Indiana, on August 21, 1862.

The regiment mustered out and its remaining recruits with the regiment were amalgamated with the 48th Indiana Volunteer Infantry on June 5, 1865.

Strength and Casualties
The 99th Indiana originally mustered 900 men, and added 84 recruits over the course of the war.  The regiment lost 178 men from death from all causes, Another 38 men of the 99th deserted, and two were missing in action.

Colonels
 Alexander Fowler
 Josiah Farrar

See also
List of Indiana Civil War regiments
 Lucas, D. R. New History of the 99th Indiana Infantry. Rockford, 1900.

References

The Civil War Index

99
Iron Brigade
Military units and formations established in 1862
Military units and formations disestablished in 1865
1862 establishments in Indiana